A riverfront is a region along a river. Often in larger cities that are traversed or bordered by one or more rivers, the riverfront is lined with marinas, docks, cafes, museums, parks, or minor attractions. Today many riverfronts are a staple of modernism and city beautification.

List of riverfronts in Asia

India

Japan

China

Pakistan

List of riverfronts in Europe

Finland

Poland

Germany

List of riverfronts in North America

United States of America

List of riverfronts in South America

List of riverfronts in Oceania

Australia

List of riverfronts in Africa

Images

See also 
 Boardwalk
 Esplanade
 Riverwalk (disambiguation)
 Corniche

Urban design
Pedestrian infrastructure
 Riverfront